Nuno Morais (25 April 1923 – 2 September 1986) was a Portuguese sprinter. He competed in the men's 100 metres at the 1948 Summer Olympics.

Competition record

References

1923 births
1986 deaths
Athletes (track and field) at the 1948 Summer Olympics
Portuguese male sprinters
Olympic athletes of Portugal
Place of birth missing